Wolf Parade (6 Song EP) is the second EP by Canadian indie rock band Wolf Parade.  The EP is a collaborative effort by the band members.  Song writing and vocals are split between members Dan Boeckner and Spencer Krug.

All songs but "The National People's Scare" and "Killing Armies" would later be re-recorded for the band's debut LP Apologies to the Queen Mary. The recording of Killing Armies from this EP appears as an iTunes bonus track for the LP.

The EP is packaged in a clear plastic sleeve, with the CD itself wrapped in a tri-fold piece of paper with the album artwork and track listing on it. The artwork was made by Tracy Maurice.

Track listing

Personnel
Dan Boeckner – guitar, vocals
Spencer Krug – piano, keyboards, vocals
Arlen Thompson – drums, recording
Hadji Bakara – keyboards, electronics
Tracy Maurice - artwork, design

2004 EPs
Wolf Parade albums